Montagne du Charbon (1,932 m) is a mountain in the Bauges in Savoie, France.

Mountains of the Alps
Mountains of Savoie
Mountains of Haute-Savoie